For the 1946 Vuelta a España, the field consisted of 48 riders; 29 finished the race.

References

1946 Vuelta a España
1946